On the Road to Kingdom Come is the sixth studio album by the American singer-songwriter Harry Chapin, released in 1976. Longer versions of the songs "Corey's Coming" and "If My Mary Were Here" appeared on Chapin's 1979 live album Legends of the Lost and Found.

Personnel
Harry Chapin - guitar, vocals
Buzz Brauner - recorder
Stephen Chapin - keyboards, vocals
Carolyn Dennis - vocals
Ron Evanuik - cello
Donna Fein - vocals
Howie Fields - drums, percussion
Bobbye Hall - percussion
Muffy Hendrix - vocals
Sharon Hendrix - vocals
Doug Walker - guitar, vocals
John Wallace - bass, vocals
Robert Ludwig - mastering engineer

Charts

References

Harry Chapin albums
1976 albums
Elektra Records albums